Lonza Group is a Swiss multinational manufacturing company for the pharmaceutical, biotechnology and nutrition sectors, headquartered in Basel, with major facilities in Europe, North America and South Asia. Lonza was established under that name in the late 19th-century in Switzerland. The company provides product development services to the pharmaceutical and biologic industries, including custom manufacturing of biopharmaceuticals and detection systems and services for the bioscience sector.

History
Lonza was founded in 1897 in the small Swiss town of Gampel, situated in the canton of Valais, taking its name from the nearby river. In the course of the 20th century Lonza evolved from hydroelectricity and C2 chemistry, through nitrogen chemistry to petrochemistry before moving into fine chemistry and biochemistry.

Initially, the company produced electricity. The following year, calcium carbide manufacture began using the electricity to heat a furnace to the 2000 °C required for quicklime to react with coal. Lonza moved to neighbouring Visp (where it retains a production site today) in 1909.  Competition from electric lighting reduced demand for calcium carbide and in 1915 Lonza started industrial production of calcium cyanamide which became popular as a cheap nitrogenous fertilisers, only to be supplanted by urea. Several new processes were launched in the 1920s.  In addition to an electrolysis plant capable of making 5800 m3 hydrogen per hour, came metaldehyde, ammonia and ketene. In 1923, Lonza started to convert calcium carbide to metaldehyde (sold as a solid fuel under the brand 'Meta' and then slug repellant) via acetylene and acetaldehyde. In 1925, ammonia production was started, with a process licensed from Casale.  Ammonia was also converted to nitric acid. With calcium cyanamide and calcium nitrate (made from nitric acid), Lonza commercialised formulated fertilisers starting in the 1930s. At the start of World War II, Lonza was contracted by the Swiss government to produce synthetic fuel, which it did by converting acetaldehyde to paraldehyde, used as an additive in transport fuel. In 1928, ketene production started using acetic acid made by oxidation of acetaldehyde. Ketene was initially used to make cellulose acetate for rayon manufacture, but after 1947 Lonza converted most of its ketene to diketene, which was then converted to a range of chemical precursors. Diketene capacity rose to 18'000t per year in 1993. In 1956, the production of niacin (an important vitamin) via 5-ethyl-2-methyl-pyridine. In the 1940s, Lonza used its C2 basis to enter the vinyl chloride business. The production was relocated to Sins and finally discontinued.

At the 1959 AGM, it was decided to back integrate into petrochemistry, and Montecatini was contracted to build the world's smallest cracker in Visp. The initial failure of this plant to meet its specifications triggered a CHF12mio penalty, which Lonza used to build a research center.

1962: Lonza acquired the Ftalital works in Scanzorosciate, Italy which manufactured intermediates for polyester resins, and started work on the new headquarters building in Basel.
1969 Lonza expands into the United States and founds Lonza Inc. in Fair Lawn, New Jersey. This and the acquisition of a Mapleton, Illinois plant producing sorbitol, tertiary amines and quaternary ammonium compounds creates the Chemical Specialties Business Unit.
1974, the group merged with aluminium firm Alusuisse, after which the group moved into the biotechnology sector.
1977: Lonza's first US fine chemicals plant starts operation in Bayport, Texas
1980: Lonza's Polymers and Additives Business Unit starts with HQ in Milan, and the acquisition of a plasticizers and unsaturated polyester resins plant in San Giovanni Valdarno site.
1984: Startup of the first multipurpose plants at the fine chemicals complex in Visp, Switzerland, marking the inception of Lonza's contract manufacturing business.
1985: Acquisition of Molding Compounds SpA (Brembate Sopra, Italy) a company producing Sheet Moulding Compound and Bulk Moulding Compound.
1990: Acquisition Reglar Srl (Scanzorosciate, Italy) another SMC and BMC producer and Resinmec SpA, Pontirolo Nuovo and Pandino, Italy, a thermoplastic resin compounder.
1991: Purchase of Duroform GmbH in Miehlen, Germany, another SMC and BMC producer, later incorporated into Polynt.
1992: Acquisition of Biotec sro, (Kourim, Czech Republic) a biotech producer of fine chemicals.
1996: joint venture 80:20 with the Economic Development Board signed for a $125mio, 70kt/y isophthalic acid plant on Palau Sakra.
1996: acquired Celltech Biologics and began producing mammalian cell cultures and monoclonal antibodies.
1999 Lonza de-merged from the Alusuisse-Lonza Group and listed on the SWX Swiss Exchange.
2005 Lonza Poland Sp. Zoo launched with construction of a new site in Niepołomice (Poland) for the production of compounds and unsaturated polyester resins.
2006,1Aug:  Lonza S.p.A. changed its name to Polynt S.p.A., listed on the STAR segment of the Italian Stock Exchange, on 30 October. This marked the exit of Lonza from the resins business. In 2020, Polynt is held by private equity.
2007: Lonza Singapore Pte Ltd. (the owner of the isophthalic acid plant) sold to Perstorp Group (already, and still in 2020, under control of private equity group PAI Partners) for USD 138 million
 2011 October: acquired American firm Arch Chemicals for $1.4 billion, thus becoming the world's largest manufacturer of biocides.
2016 August 15: announced $300mio acquisition of US based InterHealth Nutraceuticals, a leader in research, development, manufacture and marketing of value-added nutritional ingredients for use in dietary supplements.
2017 February,  announced construction of a CHF 290 million biopharmaceuticals plant (with the French pharmaceutical company Sanofi) in Visp. 
2021 July, Lonza Specialty Ingredients divested to Bain and Cinven for CHF 4.2 billion.

Lonza is involved in the manufacturing of biologics with several pharmaceutical companies. Lonza entered into a partnership with Teva in 2009 to develop and manufacture biosimilars. In 2010, they made a deal with GlaxoSmithKline to manufacture therapeutic monoclonal antibodies. In 2014, Lonza entered into an agreement with Bristol-Myers Squibb to manufacture two biologic drugs. Lonza also manufactures Imbruvica for Pharmacyclics and Mydicar for Celladon. In 2015, Lonza contracted with Alexion to construct a new facility dedicated to Alexion manufacturing. In 2017, Lonza and Sanofi partnered to construct a new facility for production of biologics.

In May 2020, Moderna struck a manufacturing deal with Lonza to produce its (mRNA-1273) COVID-19 vaccine active ingredient while expanding sterile production and fill-finish activities to 500 million doses starting in 2021. Production of the mRNA bulk vaccine started in January 2021, soon after an official visit by Swiss Federal Councilor Alain Berset. Lonza Group is responsible for the global production of two-thirds of the raw materials for the Moderna vaccine at combined U.S. and Swiss facilities. The company also started to collaborate with Altimmune Inc. for the development of a nasal COVID-19 vaccine.

Corporate structure 
As of 2020, Lonza's business areas include:

 Small Molecules: active pharmaceutical ingredients, drug product formulation
 Biologics: mammalian, microbial, licensing, bioconjugates, parenteral drug product services, mRNA
 Cell & Gene: cell and gene technologies, personalized medicine, bioscience
 Capsules & Health Ingredients: capsules, health ingredients

In November 2019, Chairman Albert Baehny became both chairman and interim CEO of Lonza after chief executive officer (CEO) Marc Funk left after 9 months. In November 2020, Pierre-Alain Ruffieux commenced his role as Chief Executive Officer.

Business operations 
, Lonza had twenty-four self-described major sites located in the United States, India, the Czech Republic, Belgium, Spain, China, France, South Africa, Switzerland, Singapore, Mexico, Japan, Brazil and the United Kingdom. This site accounting shows significant changes from a 2016 self-description, which listed sixteen major sites. The presence in India was established in Genome Valley, where ground was broken in 2011.

In 2018, Lonza opened a  facility in the United States in Pearland, Texas (a suburb of Houston). This is one of four sites which are focused on cell and gene therapy, the other three being in Portsmouth, New Hampshire; Geleen, Netherlands; and Singapore.

, the company has employed over 17,500 people, across about 35 countries.

References

External links

 

Biotechnology companies of Switzerland
Companies listed on the SIX Swiss Exchange
Dual-listed companies
Manufacturing companies based in Basel
Manufacturing companies established in 1897
Multinational companies headquartered in Switzerland
Pharmaceutical companies established in 1897
1897 establishments in Switzerland